Mert Tunço (born 17 May 1995) is a Turkish badminton player.

Achievements

BWF International Challenge/Series 
Men's doubles

  BWF International Challenge tournament
  BWF International Series tournament
  BWF Future Series tournament

References

External links 
 
 

1995 births
Living people
Turkish male badminton players
21st-century Turkish people